The Iranian Volleyball Super League (IVSL) is a professional volleyball league in Iran at the top of the Iranian volleyball league system. It was founded in 1975 as the Pasargad Cup, but after the Iranian Revolution it was renamed to the first Division. In 1997 the league system was revamped and the Iranian Super League was established. Paykan Tehran has won the most titles in the new Super League with 12 titles.

History
The first season of a national Iranian volleyball league was held in 1975 with 12 teams competing. In 1976 Esteghlal became the champions for the first time, and they repeated this feat in the following season. In 1979 due to the Iranian Revolution the league was canceled.

In 1989, the first Hazfi Cup for Iranian volleyball teams was held, in which Esteghlal became the first champions. During this period there was no national league and teams competed in the provincial and local leagues instead.

Shortly after the Hazfi Cup, in 1990 the national volleyball league of Iran was restarted by the Iranian Volleyball Federation with 10 teams competing and was called the Fajr Cup. In 2010 the format of the league was changed and 12 teams competed in the league, which was later increased to 14 shortly after and the name was also changed to the Iranian Volleyball Super League or the Iranian Volleyball Premier League.

Current teams
Azar Battery Urmia
Foolad Sirjan
Hoorsun Ramsar
Khatam Ardakan
Labanyat Haraz Amol
Paykan Tehran
Rahyab Melal Marivan
Saipa Tehran
Sepahan Isfahan
Shahdab Yazd
Shahrdari Gonbad
Shahrdari Qazvin
Shahrdari Urmia
Shahrdari Varamin

League champions

Pasargad Cup

First Division

Super League

Titles by club

Titles by city

Notable foreign players

See also
AVC Club Championships
Iranian Women's Volleyball Premier League

References

External links
I.R. Iran Volleyball Federation
 League champions

League
Iran
Volleyball
Professional sports leagues in Iran